Congress Nagar is a metro station on the Orange Line of the Nagpur Metro. It was opened on 6 April 2021. The station is connected to platform 1 of the Ajni railway station.

The station covers an area of 8,100 square meters.

Station Layout

References

Nagpur Metro stations
Railway stations in India opened in 2021